Live' Melt Down is the third live album released by the Japanese heavy metal band Anthem and recorded during their "Overload Live" tour of 2003.

Track listing
"Demon's Ride" - 5:06
"Overload" - 4:34
"Machine Made Dog" - 6:00
"Venom Strike" - 5:11
"Tears for the Lovers" - 7:27
"Silent Child" - 4:29
"Cryin' Heart" - 5:05
"Gotta Go" - 5:03
"Grieve of Heart" - 4:24
"Running Blood" - 5:59
"Revenge" - 4:54
"Wild Anthem" - 5:40
"Steeler" - 4:35

Personnel

Band members
Eizo Sakamoto - vocals
Akio Shimizu - guitars
Naoto Shibata - bass, producer
Hirotsugu Homma - drums

References

2003 live albums
Anthem (band) albums
Victor Entertainment live albums